James Ernest Prentice (28 December 1949 – 24 September 2010) was an Australian rules footballer who played with South Melbourne in the Victorian Football League (VFL).

Prentice returned to play with Ariah Park - Mirrool and won two South West Football League best and fairest awards, the Gammage Medal in 1975 and 1977 and was runner up in 1979 too.

Prentice was captain coach of Ariah Park - Mirrool from 1976 to 1977.

Prentice was captain-coach of Devonport Football Club for one year in 1978 and won the Wander Medal in the North West Football Union, while playing with Devonport.

Prentice then returned to play with Ariah Park - Mirrool and was captain of the 1979 South West Football League inter league representative side.

Notes

External links 

1972 South Melbourne FC team photo
28th July 1973 -VFL Record front cover: Jim Prentice

		
1949 births		
Australian rules footballers from New South Wales		
Sydney Swans players
2010 deaths